Stanley Hoffman, also known as Kwayzar (alias of; 11 February 1928 – 11 March 2018) was an American singer and rapper from Southern California, known for his octogenarian rap performances. He was inspired by artists such as Ice Cube and Eminem.

During World War II, he served in the United States Navy, and he also tried a career as a comedian and actor, but although he was in many movies he never made it big. Under the pseudonym Skip Stanley, in 1957, he recorded the atomic music song, "Satellite Baby." In between his singing career and his rap career, Kwayzar was a realtor.

Risher Mortuary posted an online memorial indicating that Hoffman had passed on March 11, 2018, at the age of 90.

References

Further reading

"Singers, writers stay young". Press-Telegram.  "Don't believe me? You can hear parts of the tracks at www.cdbaby.com/cd/kwayzar. Stan goes by the name of Kwayzar (his rap form of "quasar"), and if you log into the site, his fish-eye mug will stare back at..."

1928 births
2018 deaths
American male rappers
Rappers from California
United States Navy sailors
Place of birth missing
American male singers